Lead Me Home is a 2021 American short documentary film made for Netflix and directed by Pedro Kos and Jon Shenk. It was nominated for Best Documentary Short Subject at the 94th Academy Awards.

Summary
The film follows several homeless people living on the streets of the West Coast of the United States.

Release and reception
The film was released on November 30, 2021.

On review aggregator Rotten Tomatoes, the film holds a 100% approval rating based on 5 reviews.

References

External links 

2021 films
2021 short documentary films
American short documentary films
Documentary films about homelessness in the United States
Documentary films about poverty in the United States
2020s English-language films
2020s American films